Kanathur may refer to:

 Kanathur (Chennai), a southern coastal neighbourhood of Chennai, India
 Kanathur (Karnataka), a village in Turvekere taluk of Tumkur district, Karnataka, India
 Former name of Kannur Municipality, Kerala, India